In computers, J2STask is a software product that was developed by J2S to streamline the workflow of people who process digital raster graphics (or Encapsulated PostScript) files. It is designed to automatically complete repetitive operations on large numbers of image files stored on a local hard disk, or on an ftp server (J2S, n.d.). It requires Mac OS X v10.2 or newer, and costs 1,200 EUR (MacMinute, 2004).

References 
MacMinute. (2004). J2STask 1.0 image workflow manager released. Retrieved January 14, 2004.
J2S. (n.d.). J2STask: task manager for image worklow. Retrieved January 14, 2004.

Graphics software